Manoj Pant is an Indian expert in International Trade. He is the Director of Indian Institute of Foreign Trade, since August 2017. 
Previously, he was a full-time professor at the Centre for International Trade and Development, Jawaharlal Nehru University, where he taught international trade theory. Before that he taught economics at Delhi University.

Education
Pant has obtained his undergraduate degrees from St. Stephen's College, Delhi and his master's degree from Delhi School of Economics. He has done his Ph.D. at Southern Methodist University, Dallas, Texas, USA.

Publications
Pant used to be a regular newspaper contributor writing for The Economic Times on trade, investment and competition issues. He has published two books and over a dozen articles.

References

External links
 Profile of Prof. Pant at Jawaharlal Nehru University

Indian business writers
Academic staff of Jawaharlal Nehru University
Year of birth missing (living people)
Living people